The V-Dem Democracy Indices is a dataset that describe qualities of different governments published by V-Dem Institute. This dataset is published on an annual basis and is publicly available and free. In particular, the V-Dem dataset is a popular dataset among political scientists used to describe the characteristics of political regimes around the world. In total, datasets released by the V-Dem Institute include information on hundreds of indicator variables describing all aspects of government, especially on the quality of democracy, inclusivity, and other economic indicators. An R package automatically bundles new data.

The V-Dem Institute's measures of democracy are the most elaborate and granular among several democracy indexes (such as the Polity data series and Freedom House's Freedom in the World). By 2020, the V-Dem index had "more than 470 indicators, 82 mid-level indices, and 5 high-level indices covering 202 polities from the period of 1789–2019." Each indicator is coded independently by at least five country experts. V-Dem uses methodological tools to deal with rating reliability and confidence intervals in the expert ratings. Political scientist Daniel Hegedus describes V-Dem as "the most important provider of quantitative democracy data for scholarly research."

Democracy indices

Regimes of the World 
The Regimes of the World (RoW) distinguishes four types of political systems: closed autocracies, electoral autocracies, electoral democracies, and liberal democracie, this classification is built on V-Dem Democracy Core indices.

V-Dem Core 
The V-Dem institute publishes, as of 2022, 483 indicators unique to V-Dem institute and republishes 59 other indicators. V-Dem publishes five core indices with several other supplementary indices. The core indices are the electoral democracy index, the liberal democracy index, the participatory democracy index, the Deliberative Democracy Index and the egalitarian democracy index.

The Electoral Democracy Index
This index measures the principle of electoral or representative democracy, including whether elections were free and fair, as well as the prevalence of a free and independent media. This index is part of all the other indices as a central component of democracy.
Liberal Democracy Index
This index incorporates measures of rule of law, checks and balances, and civil liberties along with the concepts measured in the electoral democracy index.
Participatory Democracy Index
This index measures the degree to which citizens participate in their own government through local democratic institutions, civil society organizations, direct democracy, and the concepts measured in the electoral democracy index.
Deliberative Democracy Index
This index measures the degree to which decisions are made in the best interest of the people as opposed to due to coercion or narrow interest groups, in addition to the basic electoral democracy index.
Egalitarian Democracy Index
This index measures the level of equal access to resources, power, and freedoms across various groups within a society, in addition to the level of electoral democracy.

Other Indices 
The V-Dem institute publishes several other indices which are created, in part, with the assistance of other V-Dem indices.

Rankings 
The table below shows how countries score on the 5 high-level V-Dem Democracy indices in 2023.

Impact and usage 

A variety of other organizations use V-Dem's dataset in the construction of their indicators. USAID's Journey to Self Reliance Country Roadmap uses V-Dem's data to inform three of its indicators: Liberal Democracy (from V-Dem's Liberal Democracy Index), Social Group Equality (from V-Dem's Social Group Equality in Respect for Civil Liberties) and Civil Society and Media Effectiveness (from V-Dem's Diagonal Accountability Index). The World Bank's Worldwide Governance Indicators also use V-Dem's data to inform their Control of Corruption indicator (includes V-Dem's Corruption index), Rule of Law Indicator (includes V-Dem's liberal component index), and the Voice and Accountability Indicator (includes V-Dem's Expanded freedom of expression, Freedom of association, and Clean elections indicators).

Digital Society Project 
The Digital Society Project is a subset of indicators on V-Dem's survey which asks questions about the political status of social media and the internet. Specifically, the Digital Society Project measures a range of questions related to internet censorship, misinformation online, and internet shutdowns. This annual report includes 35 indicators assessing five areas: disinformation, digital media freedom, state regulation of digital media, polarization of online media, and online social cleavages. It has been updated each year starting in 2019, with data covering from 2000-2021. Similar to other expert analyses like Freedom House, these data are more prone to false positives when compared with remotely sensed data, such as that from Access Now or the OpenNet Initiative.

Criticisms 
V-Dem rankings were criticised by American sociologist Salvatore Babones for their decision to downgrade India while under Narendra Modi's premiership and called for a retraction; noting their evidence to be flawed and wildly disproportionate. While he agreed that statistical models used by V-Dem are, indeed, world-class the problem with indices derives from "idiosyncratic choice of indicators", "inexplicable scaling decisions", and "vulnerability to expert biases". He also found that the problems are not limited to V-Dem's India scores but extend to entire rankings of V-Dem and noted that “V-Dem’s electoral indicators fail to differentiate between genuine and “sham” democracies, with the result that one-party dictatorships can and often do score higher than real democracies for the quality of their elections”. Political scientist Asutosh Varshney found V-Dem's proposition that India is an electoral autocracy an "overstretched claim".

Political scientist Jonas Wolff criticised V-Dem for gradual abandonment of a pluralist conceptualisation of democracy and downplaying the inherent limitations of liberal democracy. According to him, V-Dem has moved away from its original emphasis on the conceptual varieties of democracy and adopted a decontested view on democracy as liberal democracy.

See also 
 Democracy index

References

Further reading
  Max Fisher, "U.S. Allies Drive Much of World’s Democratic Decline, Data Shows: Washington-aligned countries backslid at nearly double the rate of non-allies, data shows, complicating long-held assumptions about American influence" New York Times Nov 16, 2021
 Vanessa A. Boese, Markus Eberhardt: Which Institutions Rule? Unbundling the Democracy-Growth Nexus, V-Dem Institute, Series 2022:131, February 2022

External links
 Official website

Electoral systems
Psephology